Top Gun: Maverick (Music from the Motion Picture) is the soundtrack to the 2022 action film Top Gun: Maverick by Lorne Balfe, Harold Faltermeyer, Lady Gaga, and Hans Zimmer.  It consists of the film's score as well as two original songs, "Hold My Hand" by Gaga and "I Ain't Worried" by OneRepublic, which were released as singles prior to the album. The soundtrack contains the song "Danger Zone" by Kenny Loggins, which was also featured in the first film. The soundtrack was released on May 27, 2022, through Interscope Records through digital and physical formats.

Development
By June 2017, Top Gun composer Harold Faltermeyer had returned to score for the sequel. Later, in October 2018, Hans Zimmer joined Faltermeyer to score for the film, accompanied by Lorne Balfe and Lady Gaga also joining the film later. Zimmer produced a new original theme for the film that was featured in the February 2022 trailer, and was played by guitarist Johnny Marr. Marr claimed that the theme was "completely accidental" and did not watch the preview of the film before scoring. Speaking in an interview to Variety, Marr said "I think there was some issue with how the theme was sounding, and I was around and I have a guitar. It really was as simple as that." Twenty One Pilots frontman Tyler Joseph said that their band was reported to feature in the soundtrack, before Tom Cruise ousted them. He revealed in an interview that "I was working with the music placement person for the new Top Gun on writing a new song for them, and then I believe Tom Cruise came in and just fired everyone," Tyler also noted, "It was actually pretty soon after they brought me in to show me parts of the movie and what they were looking for and stuff. Then I got word that there was like a wholesale swap." Musician Kenny Loggins has confirmed that his song "Danger Zone", which was used in the first film, will be featured in the sequel. "Great Balls of Fire", another song from the first film performed by Jerry Lee Lewis, was also featured in the sequel. The song is performed by Miles Teller, who plays Lt. Bradley "Rooster" Bradshaw.

On April 27, 2022, Gaga announced that she had written and recorded the song "Hold My Hand", which would serve as the film's theme song, in addition to producing the score. Gaga said that she worked on the song for years, and "didn't even realize the multiple layers it spanned across the film's heart, my own psyche, and the nature of the world we've been living in" while writing it. The song, released as a single on May 3, 2022, was co-written with Benjamin Rice and BloodPop. Another single, "I Ain't Worried" by OneRepublic was released on May 13. It was sent to contemporary hit radio in the United States on June 21, 2022. The soundtrack album was released on May 27, 2022, by Interscope Records.

Reception
The soundtrack received positive reviews, with Pete Hammond of Deadline Hollywood, Brian Lloyd of Entertainment.ie, Tomris Larfy of RogerEbert.com and Chris Bumbray of JoBlo.com calling the score composed by Faltermeyer, Gaga, Balfe and Zimmer as "one of the positive aspects of the film". Zanobard Reviews stated "the soundtrack of Top Gun: Maverick is a thoroughly entertaining and incredibly nostalgic musical experience from beginning to end".

Track listing
All performed by Lorne Balfe, Harold Faltermeyer, Lady Gaga (Stefani Germanotta), and Hans Zimmer except where noted

Songs not included in the soundtrack, but featured in the film include the following:
 Hank Williams – "Your Cheatin' Heart" – Plays at the small town diner after Maverick crashes the Darkstar
 David Bowie – "Let's Dance" – Plays on jukebox at the Hard Deck bar
 T. Rex – "Bang a Gong (Get It On)" – Plays on jukebox at the bar
 Otis Redding and Carla Thomas – "Tramp" – Plays on jukebox at the bar when Rooster first appears
 Foghat – "Slow Ride" – Plays on jukebox at the bar, as selected by Hangman
 The Who – "Won't Get Fooled Again" – Plays on the first training montage

Credits
Credits adapted from Film Music Reporter

 Supervising music editor: Cecile Tournesac
 Music editor: Ryan Rubin
 Additional music editorial: Peter Myles, Mikael Sandgren
 Music consultants: Jason Bentley, T Bone Burnett, Kathy Nelson, Ryan Tedder
 Additional music: David Fleming, Andrew Kawczynski, Steve Mazzaro
 Additional arrangements: Steve Davis, Sven Faulconer, Stuart Michael Thomas, Max Aruj, Steffen Thum
 Featured musicians:
 Bass: Nico Abondolo, Trey Henry
 Cello: Tina Guo, Ro Rowan
 French horn: Dylan S. Hart
 Trumpet: Thomas Hooten
 Electric guitar: Lexii Lynn Frazier, Stuart Michael Thomas
 Drums: Chad Smith
 Violin: Ben Powell
 Score consultant: Guthrie Govan
 Orchestrations: Bruce Fowler, Walt Fowler, David Giuli, Jennifer Hammond, Yvonne Suzette Moriarty, Booker White
 Music preparation: Booker White
 Orchestral contractor: Peter Rotter
 Score mixing: Al Clay, Stephen Lipson
 Score mix assistant: Alvin Wee
 Sequencer programming: Omer Benyamin, Steven Doar
 Technical score engineer: Chuck Choi
 Technical assistants: Alejandro Moros, Alex Lamy, Fabio Marks, Jim Grimwade, Aldo Arechar, Kevin Anderson, Florian Faltermeyer, Alfie Godfrey, Michael Bitton
 Synth programming: Hans Zimmer, Lorne Balfe
 Synth design: Kevin Schroeder
 Digital instrument design: Mark Wherry
 Digital instrument preparation: Taurees Habib, Raul Vega
 Music production services: Steven Kofsky
 Score coordinators: Shalini Singh, Queenie Li

Charts

Weekly charts

Monthly charts

Year-end charts

Certifications

Release history

References

2022 soundtrack albums
Interscope Records soundtracks
Top Gun
Lady Gaga albums
Hans Zimmer soundtracks
Action film soundtracks
Albums produced by Lady Gaga
Albums produced by BloodPop
Albums produced by Giorgio Moroder
Albums produced by Ryan Tedder